In mathematics, Hilbert–Schmidt may refer to

 a Hilbert–Schmidt operator;
 a Hilbert–Schmidt integral operator;
 the Hilbert–Schmidt theorem.